Ma Huanhuan (born 13 January 1990 in Guangxi) is a female Chinese professional water polo player who was part of the silver medal winning team at the 2007 World Junior Championship. She has competed at the 2008, 2012 and 2016 Summer Olympics. She is a leading goalscorer in Olympic water polo history, with 37 goals.

See also
 China women's Olympic water polo team records and statistics
 List of players who have appeared in multiple women's Olympic water polo tournaments
 List of women's Olympic water polo tournament top goalscorers
 List of World Aquatics Championships medalists in water polo

References

External links
 

1990 births
Living people
Chinese female water polo players
Olympic water polo players of China
Sportspeople from Guangxi
Water polo players at the 2008 Summer Olympics
Water polo players at the 2012 Summer Olympics
Water polo players at the 2016 Summer Olympics
Asian Games medalists in water polo
Water polo players at the 2010 Asian Games
Asian Games gold medalists for China
Medalists at the 2010 Asian Games
World Aquatics Championships medalists in water polo
Universiade medalists in water polo
Universiade gold medalists for China
Medalists at the 2009 Summer Universiade
Medalists at the 2011 Summer Universiade
21st-century Chinese women